Sanjin Bezdrob (born 22 November 1979) is a Bosnian volleyball player at national and international level and captain of the Bosnian national volleyball team.

Playing for Bosnia's most successful volleyball club OK Kakanj, he was a member of the Premier League of Volleyball of Bosnia and Herzegovina national championship winning team 2 times (2001, 2003) and the National Cup of Bosnia and Herzegovina winning team on 3 occasions (2001, 2002, 2003).

In the 2004–2005 season he played for OK Calcit Kamnik (Slovenia), including appearances in the CEV Cup.

In the 2009–2010 season he played for OK Ljubinje.

In the 2012–2017 season he played for OK Ilijaš

He is 1.97 m (6 ft 51/2 in.) tall.

References

1979 births
Bosnia and Herzegovina men's volleyball players
Living people
Sportspeople from Sarajevo